Point Cartwright is a rocky headland at the mouth of the Mooloolah River in Queensland, Australia, renowned for its scenic beauty and landmark lighthouse, Point Cartwright Light. It is located 14 km north of Caloundra.

History
The headland was named Point Raper in 1861 by Lieutenant Heath of the Royal Navy. Some time after 1861 the current name of Point Cartwright was bestowed on the point thought to have been named after Edmund Cartwright who developed weaving and combing equipment in the industrial revolution. Cartwright's invention was closely associated with Sir Richard Arkwright's machinery invented for cotton spinning factories. It is thought that at the same time that Point Cartwright was named, the headland known as Petrie Heads was also renamed to Point Arkwright.  It is not known who changed the name to Point Cartwright and Point Arkwright or why they were changed, but it is obvious they are intended to be grouped.

The New Caloundra Light built in 1967 became ineffective towards the end of the 1970s and so in May 1978 construction started on Point Cartwright Light, being officially opened on 10 September 1979.

References

Sunshine Coast Region
Headlands of Queensland